In Greek mythology, Ossa (Ancient Greek: Όσσα) or Assa was the mother of King Sithon of Thrace by the sea god Poseidon. Her son was notorious for killing the wooers of his daughter, Pallene. In some accounts, the war-god Ares and Anchiroe were called the parents of Sithon.

Note

References 

 Conon, Fifty Narrations, surviving as one-paragraph summaries in the Bibliotheca (Library) of Photius, Patriarch of Constantinople translated from the Greek by Brady Kiesling. Online version at the Topos Text Project.
Stephanus of Byzantium, Stephani Byzantii Ethnicorum quae supersunt, edited by August Meineike (1790–1870), published 1849. A few entries from this important ancient handbook of place names have been translated by Brady Kiesling. Online version at the Topos Text Project.

Women of Poseidon
Mythological Thracian women
Women in Greek mythology
Thracian characters in Greek mythology
Greek mythology of Thrace